The 1979 Birmingham WCT was a men's tennis tournament played on indoor carpet courts. It was the seventh edition of the Grand Prix Birmingham, and part of the 1979 Colgate Palmolive Grand Prix. It took place in Birmingham, Alabama, United States from January 15 through January 21, 1979. First-seeded Jimmy Connors won the singles title, his fifth at the event.

Finals

Singles 
 Jimmy Connors defeated  Eddie Dibbs 6–2, 3–6, 7–5
 It was Connors' 1st singles title of the year and the 72nd of his career.

Doubles 
 Stan Smith /  Dick Stockton defeated  Ilie Năstase /  Tom Okker 6–2, 6–3

References

External links
 ITF tournament edition details

Birmingham WCT
Birmingham WCT
Birmingham WCT
Birmingham WCT